Dougald Kennedy (12 September 1869 – 31 May 1937) was a Progressive party member of the House of Commons of Canada. He was born in Halton County, Ontario and became a farmer.

Kennedy served as a municipal councillor at Van Horne Township, Ontario.

He was elected to Parliament at the Port Arthur and Kenora riding in the 1921 general election. After completing one federal term, 14th Canadian Parliament, Kennedy left the House of Commons and did not seek re-election in the 1925 vote.

External links
 

1869 births
1937 deaths
Canadian farmers
Members of the House of Commons of Canada from Ontario
Ontario municipal councillors
Progressive Party of Canada MPs
People from the Regional Municipality of Halton
People from Kenora District